Sope Dirisu (born 9 January 1991) is a British actor. He made his film debut in 2016 with Sand Castle, Criminal, and The Huntsman: Winter's War. Since 2020, he has starred as Elliot Finch in the Sky Atlantic series Gangs of London.

Early life
Dirisu was born in 1991 in Edgware, London, to Nigerian parents. He was educated at Bedford Modern School, where he excelled at drama, and joined the National Youth Theatre in 2006. He later studied Economics at the University of Birmingham. While studying there he played quarterback for the University of Birmingham Lions American Football team.

Career
In 2012, Dirisu successfully auditioned for the Royal Shakespeare Company’s Open Stages Programme. His first stage role was as Pericles in Shakespeare’s Pericles, Prince of Tyre. After the Royal Shakespeare Company, Dirisu returned to the National Youth Theatre where he trained in the REP company programme for eight months. He has subsequently acted in a number of television series including The Mill, Utopia, Humans, The Casual Vacancy, Siblings and Undercover.

Dirisu appeared in three 2016 films, Criminal, The Huntsman: Winter's War, and Sand Castle. In 2016, he also appeared in "Nosedive", an episode of the anthology series Black Mirror.

Dirisu received a Commendation at the Ian Charleson Awards for his 2017 performance as Coriolanus in Coriolanus at the Royal Shakespeare Company.

He was nominated as Best Actor for the 2020 British Independent Film Awards for his role as Bol in the film His House.

Filmography
Film
{| class="wikitable sortable"
|-
! Year
! Title
! Role
! class="unsortable"|Notes
|-
| 2016
| Criminal| Fire Officer
| 
|-
| 2016
| The Huntsman: Winter's War| Tull
| 
|-
| 2017
| Sand Castle| Sgt. Cole 
| 
|-
| 2020
| His House| Bol
| 
|-
| 2021
| Mothering Sunday| Donald
|
|-
| 2021
|Silent Night| James
|
|-
| 2021
| Tides
| Tucker
| Also released as The Colony
|-
| 2022
|Mr. Malcolm's List
|Mr. Malcolm
|
|-
|}

Television

Stage
6 October - 3 December 2016, as Cassius Clay in One Night in Miami by Kemp Powers, at Donmar Warehouse in London, alongside David Ajala as Jim Brown, Arinzé Kene as Sam Cooke, Francois Battiste as Malcolm X.

Other theatre includes The Whipping Man, Tory Boyz, Romeo and Juliet, Prince of Denmark, Red Riding Hood, Our Days of Rage, Fallujah, Pericles (RSC).

Dirisu received a Commendation at the Ian Charleson Awards for his 2017 performance as Coriolanus in Coriolanus at the Royal Shakespeare Company.

Awards and nominations

References

External links

1991 births
Living people
English male film actors
English male stage actors
English male television actors
21st-century English male actors
Black British male actors
People from Edgware
People educated at Bedford Modern School
Alumni of the University of Birmingham
National Youth Theatre members
English people of Nigerian descent
British male stage actors